Isophrictis meridionella is a moth of the family Gelechiidae. It was described by Gottlieb August Wilhelm Herrich-Schäffer in 1854. It is found in Spain, France and on Sardinia.

The forewings are ash grey, the margin broadly rust yellowish, interrupted three times near the tip.

References

Moths described in 1854
Isophrictis